Marco Beltrame (born December 23, 1986) is a retired Italian World Cup ski jumper.

Beltrame, born in Gemona del Friuli, placed third in the large hill event of the 2005 Italian championships of ski jumping. He competed in the Winter Olympics in Torino 2006, but did not pass the qualification. His personal best is 185 metres, that he took in Planica 2005.

References

Italian male ski jumpers
Living people
1986 births
People from Gemona del Friuli
Sportspeople from Friuli-Venezia Giulia